Redouane Kerrouche (born 26 April 1994) is a French professional footballer who plays as a midfielder.

Career
Kerrouche played two season with Lusitanos Saint-Maur, helping win promotion into the Championnat National 2. He transferred to Paris FC on 23 June 2017. He made his professional debut with Paris FC in a 0–0 Ligue 2 tie with Clermont on 28 July 2017.

Personal life
Kerrouche is the youngest of 7 siblings, and is of Algerian descent.

References

External links
 
 
 L'Equipe Profile

1994 births
Living people
Footballers from Paris
Association football midfielders
French footballers
French expatriate footballers
French sportspeople of Algerian descent
JA Drancy players
US Lusitanos Saint-Maur players
Paris FC players
Oud-Heverlee Leuven players
C.D. Aves players
Le Puy Foot 43 Auvergne players
USL Dunkerque players
Challenger Pro League players
Championnat National 2 players
Ligue 2 players
Primeira Liga players
Expatriate footballers in Belgium
French expatriate sportspeople in Belgium
Expatriate footballers in Portugal
French expatriate sportspeople in Portugal
Footballers from Seine-Saint-Denis